I Died for This!? is the third studio album by American rapper Grip. It was released on August 27, 2021, through Stray Society, Shady Records and Interscope Records.

Reception 

HotNewHipHops Joshua Robinson called I Died for This!? "a top-tier rap album" and "undoubtedly an album that only a seasoned and skillful rapper could put together". Beats Per Minutes Chase McMullen said that "as his first major statement, [the album] couldn't imply more promise." Pitchforks Dylan Green called the album "a gritty showcase for [Grip's] creativity and versatility, even if it only works in fits and starts", and said that his "versatility and hunger helps Grip fit right into the label that signed Griselda and Westside Boogie."

Track listing

Personnel
Grip - vocals (all tracks)
Wiley from Atlanta - vocals (track 2)
Royce da 5'9" - vocals (track 6)
Dead Cassettes - vocals (track 8)
Eminem - vocals (track 10)
Tate228 - vocals (track 11)
Big Rube - vocals (track 12)
Ahyes - vocals (track 13)
Kay Nellz - vocals (track 17)
Kenny Mason - vocals (track 17)

References

2021 albums
Shady Records albums
Albums produced by DJ Khalil
Albums produced by Beat Butcha
Interscope Records albums